Mohammed Al-Shahrani (Arabic:محمد الشهراني, born 26 March 1996) is a Saudi football player who currently plays for Al-Kholood.

External links

References

1996 births
Living people
Saudi Arabian footballers
Al Nassr FC players
Damac FC players
Al-Adalah FC players
Al-Sahel SC (Saudi Arabia) players
Al-Kholood Club players
Saudi First Division League players
Saudi Professional League players
Association football wingers